Battle of the Commandos (also known as Legion of the Damned) is a European Macaroni-War film directed in 1969 by Umberto Lenzi. The movie was a co-production between Italy (where it was released as La legione dei dannati), West Germany (where is known with the title Die zum Teufel gehen) and Spain (where is known as La brigada de los condenados).

Cast 
 Jack Palance: Col. Charley MacPherson
 Curd Jürgens: Maj. Gen. von Reilow
 Thomas Hunter: Capt. Kevin Burke
 Robert Hundar: Pvt. Raymond Stone 
 Wolfgang Preiss: Col. Ackerman
 Helmuth Schneider: Pvt. Sam Schrier
 Guido Lollobrigida: Pvt. Tom Carlyle
 Aldo Sambrell: Sgt. Karim Habinda
 Diana Lorys: Janine
 Franco Fantasia: Schiwers, the French Maquis leader
 Gérard Herter: Lt. Hapke
 Mirko Ellis: Capt. Adler
 Bruno Corazzari: Pvt. Frank Madigan

Release
Battle of the Commandos was released in Spain on August 12, 1969 as La brigada de los condenados. It was released in West Germany on April 17, 1970 as Die zum Teufel gehen.

References

External links

1969 films
West German films
Spanish war drama films
Films directed by Umberto Lenzi
Macaroni Combat films
1969 war films
Operation Overlord films
Films with screenplays by Dario Argento
Films scored by Marcello Giombini
1960s Italian films
Italian war drama films
German war drama films
World War II films based on actual events